The Inter-Academic League (officially the Inter-Academic Association of Philadelphia and Vicinity, commonly known as the Inter-Ac) is an inter-scholastic athletic conference. The high school sports league consists of selective private schools in the Philadelphia area. The schools were organized into a conference early in 1887 when they came together as the Interacademic Athletic Association (the name was later shortened to its present configuration). Two initial sports offered by the league were football and track and field. 

It was one of the earliest permanent interscholastic football leagues, and the rivalry between Penn Charter and Germantown Academy  is perhaps the oldest football rivalry in the country.

Early members were Germantown Academy, Haverford Grammar, Penn Charter, De Lancey, Friends' Central School, Swarthmore High School, and Episcopal Academy.  In the first decade after the turn of the century the league increased the number of sports, adding ice hockey, baseball, tennis, and basketball.

Member schools
Boys' Members:

Girls' Members:

References

High school sports conferences and leagues in the United States
Pennsylvania high school sports conferences
1887 establishments in Pennsylvania
Sports organizations established in 1887